Shrek: Hassle at the Castle is a 2D beat 'em up video game released in 2002 for the Game Boy Advance. It is based on the movie Shrek, and features characters from it. It is the only game in the franchise that follows the plot of the first movie. A sequel, Shrek: Reekin' Havoc, released in 2003.

Gameplay 
Gameplay consists of 2D platforming and beat 'em up combat. Players progress through the game as Shrek, Princess Fiona, and Donkey. They travel through 24 stages of the game that represent different scenes of the movie.

The game also offers a multiplayer mode, where up to four players fight in an enclosed side-scrolling arena. Players must collect the most coins and knock them out of the possession of their opponents. The game's multiplayer allows for up to four players via the Link Cable accessory and multi-cart support.

Reception

The game was met with average reception upon release, as GameRankings gave it a score of 68.50%, while Metacritic gave it 71 out of 100.

References

External links
 

2002 video games
Game Boy Advance games
Game Boy Advance-only games
Shrek video games
Tose (company) games
Video games developed in Japan
Video games set in castles
TDK Mediactive games
Single-player video games